Neynizak (also Romanized as Neynīzak; also known as Nanīzak and Nānzak) is a village in Howmeh Rural District, in the Central District of Dashtestan County, Bushehr Province, Iran. At the 2006 census, its population was 562, in 125 families.

References 

Populated places in Dashtestan County